Bemco may refer to:

Brandeis Emergency Medical Corps
British Electrical and Manufacturing Company, see John Atkinson Pendlington